Marcus Fabius Ambustus may refer to:
 Marcus Fabius Ambustus (pontifex maximus 390 BC)
 Marcus Fabius Ambustus (consular tribune 381 BC)
 Marcus Fabius Ambustus (consul 360 BC)
 Marcus Fabius Ambustus, magister equitum in 322 B.C.